Gizur, Gizurr or Gissur was a King of the Geats. He appears in The Battle of the Goths and Huns, which is included in the Hervarar saga and in editions of the Poetic Edda. Gizur was the foster-father of Heidrek, who made a coup-d'état in Reidgotaland, the land of the Goths (see Oium and the Chernyakhov culture).

When Heidrek was dead, Gizur arrived in the Goth capital Arheimar on the Dniepr (Danpar) to pay homage to his foster-son. Heidrek's son Angantyr, who was the new king of the Goths, held a great banquet in the honour of his father. Then Heidrek's illegitimate son Hlöd, who had grown up among the Huns, arrived to claim his share of the inheritance. Angantyr offered a great many riches and a third of the Goth kingdom, but before Hlöd could answer, Gizur reminded Angantyr that Hlöd was only a bastard son and did not deserve such riches.

This caused an invasion of the Hunnish Horde (approximately 350,000 men), and prospects looked grim. Gizur supported Angantyr and helped him fight the Horde, presumably with his own Geatish forces.

Since he helped the Goths, Hlöd mockingly called the king the Grýtingaliði, an Ostrogoth (Greutungi) warrior and "Angantyr's man":

Kings of the Geats
Tyrfing cycle